The Evanston Lakeshore Historic District is a residential historic district in Evanston, Illinois. The district encompasses a section of southeast Evanston that was developed in the late nineteenth and early twentieth centuries. As Chicago expanded in the late nineteenth century, its residential development surged past its northern border and into Evanston, causing the suburb to grow considerably. Early laws, including the first municipal zoning law in 1921, restricted development in southeast Evanston to single-family houses. The expense of such houses and the popularity of the location led to the neighborhood becoming dominated by the relatively wealthy. Prominent architectural styles within the district include Italianate, Queen Anne, Tudor Revival, and Georgian Revival.

The district was added to the National Register of Historic Places on September 29, 1980.

References

National Register of Historic Places in Cook County, Illinois
Historic districts on the National Register of Historic Places in Illinois
Evanston, Illinois